Fencing events were contested at the 1959 Summer Universiade in Turin, Italy.

Medal overview

Men's events

Women's events

Medal table

External links
 Universiade fencing medalists on HickokSports

1959 Summer Universiade
Universiade
Fencing at the Summer Universiade
International fencing competitions hosted by Italy